Joseph Reece Payne (October 12, 1984 – January 24, 2020) was an American heavy metal bassist and guitarist.

He was born in Tampa, Florida, United States. Until 2011, Payne played bass in the heavy metal band Divine Heresy; with Fear Factory guitarist Dino Cazares, vocalist Travis Neal and ex-Vital Remains and Hate Eternal drummer Tim Yeung.

Payne joined death metal band Nile in early 2005 for their American and European tours, after learning eleven Nile songs in only three days.  In February 2007, Karl Sanders confirmed that Payne had been fired by the band in a posting on the band's message board. stating, "I guess I have to spell it out.  Yes, Joe is fired."  Sanders did not go on to elaborate on the reasons for Payne's dismissal.

Payne was a close friend with film producer/musician Pascual Romero.

In late 2012, Payne and an associate were arrested in connection with an investigation into the distribution of more than 2,900 grams (6.4 pounds) of marijuana.

On January 24, 2020, his former bandmate, Dino Cazares, announced that Payne had died at the age of 35. No cause of death was disclosed.

Bands
Domination Through Impurity – vocalist, lead guitarist
Pain After Death – lead guitarist
Strains – rap and rhymes
Nile (2005–2007) – touring bassist and backing vocalist
Divine Heresy – bassist
Lust of Decay – bassist
A Sudden Fear – lead guitarist

References

External links
 Official Pain After Death Myspace
 Official Divine Heresy Myspace
 Artikel about him being arrested in 2012 because of Marijuana distribution

American heavy metal bass guitarists
American heavy metal guitarists
American heavy metal musicians
1984 births
2020 deaths
Place of death missing
Musicians from Tampa, Florida
Guitarists from Florida
American male bass guitarists
21st-century American bass guitarists
21st-century American male musicians